Denmark competed at the 2007 World Championships in Athletics with 5 athletes.

Results

Men

Long jump
Qualification Group A

Triple jump
Qualification Group A

Shot put
Qualification Group A

Final

Women

800m
Heat 4

Competitors

Nations at the 2007 World Championships in Athletics
Athletics
2007